Take.2 We Are Here is the second part of the second Korean-language studio album by the South Korean boy group Monsta X. It was released by Starship Entertainment and distributed by Kakao M on February 18, 2019. It consists of ten songs, including title track "Alligator".

Background and release
The album was described as the concept of "finding hope between loss and wondering". It is also fronted by the fierce dance track "Alligator", which uses the reptilian metaphor to dramatically depict the intentions of someone aiming for the attention of a romantic interest. "Alligator" was also connected to their previous lead single "Shoot Out" from their album Take.1 Are You There? with the seven deadly sins of Christian theology concept.

The physical album was released in four versions.

Critical reception

Even before the announcement of the album title, it was already one of "The 10 Most Anticipated K-pop Albums of 2019" by the American music and entertainment magazine Billboard. 

Reviewing the album for NME, Rhian Daly wrote that Take.2 We Are Here, like its title, sounds assured. For it, the seven-piece group rediscover their niche as "masters of the throbbing dancefloor cut, sounding far more cohesive in the process".

Listicles

Commercial performance
The album debuted at number one on both weekly and monthly Gaon Album Chart and sold 174,371 copies in its first month of release (which only counted the first eleven days of sales after the album's release) in South Korea. It peaked again at number one on the weekly chart a month after its release. 

"Alligator" peaked at number one, number twenty-seven, and number seventy-six on the Gaon Social Chart, Gaon Download Chart, and Gaon BGM Chart, respectively, as well as peaking at number 133 on the Gaon Digital Chart. The other songs on the album, while they did not appear on the main chart, entered the component Gaon Download Chart, with "Ghost" debuting at 186, "Play It Cool" at 168, "No Reason" at 165, "Turbulence" at 198, "Rodeo" at 199, and "Party Time" at 196. It had four music program wins on The Show, Show Champion, M Countdown, and Music Bank.

Track listing

Charts

Album

Weekly charts

Monthly chart

Year-end chart

Song

Weekly charts

Certification and sales

Accolades

Awards and nominations

Release history

See also
 List of K-pop songs on the Billboard charts
 List of K-pop albums on the Billboard charts
 List of K-pop songs on the World Digital Song Sales chart
 List of Gaon Album Chart number ones of 2019

References

2019 albums
Korean-language albums
Monsta X albums
Starship Entertainment albums